Vaux-sous-Aubigny is a former commune in the Haute-Marne department in north-eastern France. On 1 January 2016, it was merged into the new commune Le Montsaugeonnais. Its population was 710 in 2019. It is the natal village of beekeeper Charles Dadant.

See also
Communes of the Haute-Marne department

References 

Vauxsousaubigny